Eutropis trivittata (Indian three-banded skink) is a species of skink found in India.

Description
Supranasals in contact with one another; fronto-nasal broader than long; prefrontantal in contact with one another; a pair of nuchal present or absent. No postnasal, anterior loreal higher than long. Half as long as the posterior; lower eyelid scaly; ear opening subcircular, smaller than a lateral scale with a short, pointed lobulous anteriorly. Dorsal and lateral scales subequal, with 5, sometime in adults 7, strong keels; 34 or 36 scales round the middle of the body. Digits moderately long, with smooth lamellae, 13 or 14 beneath the fourth toe; the hind-limb reaches to the wrist or the elbow. Palm of the heel and sole of the feet with enlarged sub conical tubercles intermixed with much smaller one.

Distribution
Central and western India (Bombay, Madras, Hyderabad, Madhya Pradesh, Bihar).

References

1. Smith, M.A. (1935): The Fauna of British India, Ceylon and Burma, including the whole of the Indo-Chinese sub-region. Reptilia and Amphibia. Vol. II. Sauria. – London (Taylor and Francis), xiii + 440 S. + 1 pl.
 Anderson, J., 1871 On some Indian reptiles. Proc. Zool. Soc., London: 149-211
 Hardwicke, F.R. & Gray, J.E. 1827 A synopsis of the species of saurian reptiles, collected in India by Major-General Hardwicke. Zool. J. London 3: 214-229

External links
 
 http://indianaturewatch.net/displayimage.php?id=487005

Eutropis
Reptiles described in 1827
Taxa named by Thomas Hardwicke
Taxa named by John Edward Gray